There are over 9,000 Grade I listed buildings in England. This page is a list of these buildings in the City of London.

Buildings

Churches

|}

Livery company halls

|}

Other

|}

See also
 Grade II* listed buildings in the City of London
 List of Christopher Wren churches in London

Notes

External links
 

 
Lists of Grade I listed buildings in London